Mor Gregorios Joseph (born 10 November 1960) is a Syriac Orthodox archbishop and currently the Metropolitan trustee of Jacobite Syrian Christian Church.

Early years

Mor Gregorios Joseph was born as the youngest of four children to Srambikkal Pallithitta Geevarghese and Saramma in Perumpilly, Mulanthuruthy. He is the grandchild of the cousin of Geevarghese Gregorios of Parumala. Joseph had his primary education at Perumpally Primary School and high school education from Mulanthuruthy High School.

Priesthood

At the age of 13 Joseph was ordained deacon by Geevarghese Mor Gregorios (Perumpally Thirumeni) at Mor Ignatius Dayro Manjinikkara on 25 March 1974. Joseph served as the secretary to Perumpally Thirumeni for many years. He did pre-degree and degree from Maharajas College, Ernakulam and joined Mor Julius Seminary, Perumpally, for his theological studies. Later on 25 March 1984, Joseph was ordained Kassiso at Marthoman Church, Mulanthuruthy, by Mor Baselios Paulose II, Catholicose. Joseph did his master's degree in philosophy from University of Dublin, Ireland and higher studies in theology from US. While in the US, he served as the vicar of many churches.  Joseph was ordained Ramban by Moran Mor Ignatius Zakka I Iwas at Damascus on 15 January 1994. On 16 January 1994, Joseph Ramban was consecrated Metropolitan by Moran Mor Ignatius Zakka I Iwas, the Prince Patriarch of Antioch and All the East, at Damascus, for the Cochin Diocese in Malankara. Sunthroniso was held at Kyomtha Cathedral, Thiruvankulam on 23 January 1994 and assumed the office of the diocese. Joseph  served as the president of Malankara Jacobite Syrian Sunday School Association (MJSSA) from 1996 till 2002.

Responsibilities held
 Metropolitan trustee of Jacobite Syrian Christian Church
 Metropolitan of Kochi Diocese
 Secretary to the Holy Episcopal Synod in Malankara
 Manager of the Educational Trust of the church.

References

1960 births
Living people
Syriac Orthodox Church bishops
Indian Oriental Orthodox Christians
People from Ernakulam district